Kim Chae-hwa (also Ayaka Nagase; born November 7, 1988) is a South Korean former competitive figure skater. She is the 2007 South Korean national champion. Her best result at an ISU Championship was seventh at the 2006 World Junior Championships.

Personal life 
Kim Chae-hwa was born as Ayaka Nagase on November 7, 1988 in Osaka, Japan. She is a Zainichi Korean. She studied at Kansai University.

Career 
Kim started skating at the age of 6 in Japan. She competed in Japanese domestic competitions until 2004. In 2004, the Korean Sports Council granted Kim a special scholarship for overseas Korean athletes. She was the first person to receive this scholarship.

Kim debuted internationally for Korea in the 2005–06 season. Sent to two ISU Junior Grand Prix events, she placed fourth in Canada and fifth in Poland. She appeared at two World Junior Championships, placing seventh in 2006 and 15th in 2007. On the senior level, Kim competed at six Four Continents Championships — her highest placement was 13th in 2010 — and at three Grand Prix events. She retired from competition in 2011.

Programs

Competitive highlights 
GP: Grand Prix; JGP: Junior Grand Prix

References

External links 
 

1988 births
Living people
South Korean female single skaters
Sportspeople from Osaka
Zainichi Korean people
Figure skaters at the 2011 Asian Winter Games
Kansai University alumni
Competitors at the 2009 Winter Universiade